On the Floor at the Boutique – Volume 3 is a live album mixed by Midfield General. It was recorded at the Big Beat Boutique in 1999 in Brighton, England and released in 2000.

Track listing
 "90% of Me Is You" by Gwen McCrae – 2:06
 "Cold Getting Dumb" by Just Ice – 2:33
 "Devious Mind" by Bumpy Knuckles – 3:03
 "Don't Give a Damn" by Mulder – 3:56
 "Breakdance" by Prisoners Of Technology – 3:43
 "Pony Pressure" by Lo Fidelity Allstars – 4:02
 "It Won't Be Long" (Midfield General Remix) by Super Collider – 3:33
 "Trunk of Funk" by The Bureau – 1:29
 "Waxadelica" by Wax Assassins – 3:03
 "Tied Up" by LFO – 2:26
 "Chord Memory" (Daft Punk Remix) by Ian Pooley – 4:07
 "Schlam Me" by Idjut Boys And Quakerman – 2:37
 "Inside Out" by Inner City – 3:09
 "Ulysses" (Harvey's Crowd Control Mix) by Extended Family – 3:13
 "SE15 (Taking Liberties)" by Freq Nasty – 2:31
 "High-Way" by DJ Natsu – 4:59
 "General of the Midfield" by Midfield General – 5:47
 "Rise" by Speedy J – 8:24
 "Life on Mars" by Dexter Wansel – 4:55
 "This Will Be (An Everlasting Love)" by Natalie Cole – 2:43

2000 live albums
Midfield General albums